Rym Ghezali (29 June 1982 – 17 March 2021) was an Algerian actress and singer. She was known for creating the television series El Wa3ra.

Biography
Ghezali participated in Star Academy 3 in 2005. She created and produced El Wa3ra in 2017, then acted in Boqron in 2018.

She died in Paris, France, on 17 March 2021, aged 38, suffering from cancer since 2019.

References

21st-century Algerian actresses
1982 births
2021 deaths
Actors from Algiers
Deaths from cancer in France
Algerian television actresses